The 1935–36 Cupa României was the third edition of Romania's most prestigious football cup competition.

The trophy was obtained by Ripensia Timișoara who defeated Unirea Tricolor București in the final. It was the second and last Romanian Cup won by Ripensia Timișoara.

Format
The competition is an annual knockout tournament with pairings for each round drawn at random.

There are no seeds for the draw. The draw also determines which teams will play at home. Each tie is played as a single leg.

If a match is drawn after 90 minutes, the game goes in extra time, and if the scored is still tight after 120 minutes, there a replay will be played, usually at the ground of the team who were away for the first game.

From the first edition, the teams from Divizia A entered in competition in sixteen finals, rule which remained till today.

The format is almost similar with the oldest recognised football tournament in the world FA Cup.

Bracket

First round proper

|-
|colspan=3 style="background-color:#FFCCCC;"|21 March 1936

|-
|colspan=3 style="background-color:#FFCCCC;"|22 March 1936

|-
|colspan=3 style="background-color:#FFCCCC;"|1 April 1936 — Replay

|}

Notes
Note 1: Minerul Lupeni qualified to the next round because of abolition of Herdan București.

Second round proper

|-
|colspan=3 style="background-color:#FFCCCC;"|5 April 1936  

|-
|colspan=3 style="background-color:#FFCCCC;"|12 April 1936 — Replay

|-
|colspan=3 style="background-color:#FFCCCC;"|18 April 1936 — Replay

|}

Quarter-finals

|colspan=3 style="background-color:#FFCCCC;"|18 April 1936

|-
|colspan=3 style="background-color:#FFCCCC;"|19 April 1936

|-
|colspan=3 style="background-color:#FFCCCC;"|31 May 1936

|}

Semi-finals

|colspan=3 style="background-color:#FFCCCC;"|7 June 1936

|}

Final

References

External links
romaniansoccer.ro

Cupa României seasons
Cupa
Romania